The 2011 Speedway Grand Prix was the 66th edition of the official World Championship and the 17th season of the Speedway Grand Prix era, deciding the FIM Speedway World Championship. It was the eleventh series under the promotion of Benfield Sports International, an IMG company. The series began on 30 April in Leszno and finished on 8 October in  Gorzów.

Forty-one-year-old American Greg Hancock won his second Speedway World Championship, 14 years after his first gold medal in 1997. The Swedish rider Andreas Jonsson won his first World Championship medal after finishing first in three events. Polish Jarosław Hampel won the bronze medal and made it his second medal in the Speedway Grand Prix era.

Qualification 

For the 2011 season there was 15 permanent riders, joined at each Grand Prix by one wild card and two track reserves.

2010 Grand Prix 

The top eight riders from the 2010 championship qualified as of right:

  (1) Tomasz Gollob
  (2) Jarosław Hampel
  (3) Jason Crump
  (4) Rune Holta
  (5) Greg Hancock
  (6) Chris Harris
  (7) Kenneth Bjerre
  (8) Chris Holder

Grand Prix Challenge 

The top eight riders from the 2010 championship were joined by three riders who qualified via the Grand Prix Challenge.

  (13) Artem Laguta
  (14) Antonio Lindbäck
  (11) Fredrik Lindgren

Nominations 

The final four riders were nominated by series promoters, Benfield Sports International, following the completion of the 2010 season.

  (9) Andreas Jonsson
  (10) Nicki Pedersen
  (12) Emil Sayfutdinov
  (15) Janusz Kołodziej

Qualified Substitutes 

  (19) Magnus Zetterström
  (20) Thomas H. Jonasson
  (21) Niels Kristian Iversen
  (22) Andriej Karpov
  (23) Grigory Laguta
  (24) Simon Stead

Calendar

Classification

See also 
 2011 Individual Speedway Junior World Championship

References

External links 
 SpeedwayWorld.tv - SGP news

 
2011
World Individual